A Planet Called Treason (1979) is a science fiction novel by American writer Orson Scott Card about a radical regenerative named Lanik who is banished from his kingdom and travels to different regions of the planet, discovering the powers of the people living there. It was originally published by St Martin's Press and Dell Publishing Co. After being heavily revised, and growing roughly 50 pages longer, the book was republished under the title Treason (1988), also but only by St. Martin's Press.

A Planet Called Treason was Card's second published novel-length science fiction story. The short story collection Capitol had been published in January. Hot Sleep was published in April.

Plot summary
The premise of this novel is the banishment to the seemingly metal-poor planet Treason of a group of people who attempted to create rule by an intellectual elite. The novel centers on the descendants of these anti-democratic thinkers who remain imprisoned on the planet. Through the ages, these descendants have formed nations which warred and allied with one another to gain advantages over their rivals in the race to build a starship. Due to the metal-deficiency on Treason, nations are forced to obtain it through a system of barter using teleportation devices known as Ambassadors.

The protagonist of the book is Lanik Mueller, heir apparent to the Mueller family kingdom. The Muellers, through generations of eugenics, have the ability to heal at an accelerated speed and regrow body parts naturally. The dark side to the Mueller nation is that, in order to obtain iron and other metals, they trade organs and body parts, which are harvested from radical regeneratives ("rads"). Radical regeneratives are people whose bodies can't distinguish between health and injury, and so grow extra appendages as well as organs of the opposite sex; although this is a normal phase for most Muellers at the age of puberty, the bodies of radical regeneratives never outgrow it.

After it is discovered that Lanik is a radical regenerative, Lanik's father must essentially banish him from the kingdom, so as to avoid sending him to the "pens", a place where radical regeneratives are kept in order to harvest their body parts; exile also functions to get Lanik out of the eye of the Mueller public, as well as to prevent harm from coming to Lanik's supposed younger brother Dinte. The banishment comes in the form of sending Lanik as an emissary and spy to the Nkumai, a rival nation. Due to his radical regenerative body, Lanik has grown breasts, which makes him appear to be a woman. Using this subterfuge, he poses as an ambassador from the matriarchal nation of Bird in order to discover what the Nkumai are trading in exchange for their abundant metals, which have allowed them to dominate their region militarily.

This mission is only the beginning of the adventure for Lanik, who discovers the secrets of the most powerful nations and at the same time gains additional abilities to save his people and determine the fate of his planet.

Planetary regions

Lanik travels to many of the regions of the planet Treason throughout the book, and discovers that those residing in different regions have different powers or capabilities. He first passes through the land of the Ku Kuei while on his way to Nkumai, learning that they can control the flow of time in a bubble extending out from themselves. When he comes to the land of Schwartz, he discovers that the people there are able to form rock to their will, as well as take energy from the sun. Lanik learns both of these skills and uses them to kill the "illuders" from Anderson. The illuders, as Lanik calls them, have the ability to appear to be anything they wish, clouding the minds of those around them to their will. This is what allowed them to infiltrate many regions of Treason. With the information that Lanik learned from the Ku Kei, and the Schwartz, he ultimately kills all of Anderson, and destroy all of the Ambassadors. With no way for any Family to get iron, Lanik concludes, the wars would end and there would be peace. The regions of Treason are named after each of the banished inhabitants.

See also

List of works by Orson Scott Card
A Planet Named Shayol by Cordwainer Smith

External links
About the novel Treason from Card's website

1979 American novels
1988 American novels
Novels by Orson Scott Card
1979 science fiction novels
St. Martin's Press books
Eugenics in fiction
Teleportation in fiction